Denis Vadimovich Shpakovsky (born 26 May 2001) is a Belarusian professional footballer, who plays for Dinamo Minsk.

References

External links 
 
 

2001 births
Living people
Belarusian footballers
Association football goalkeepers
FC Dinamo Minsk players